The 2009 season is the Perth Glory's second season of soccer in Australia's women's league, the W-League.

Background
Perth Glory's 2008–09 season ended finishing in seventh out of eight teams. Inaugural coach Nicola Williams was replaced by John Gibson ahead of the 2009 season. Tanya Oxtoby retained the club captaincy.

W-League
The season was played over 10 rounds, followed by a finals series.

The Glory opened their season against Melbourne Victory at Docklands Stadium on 3 October. Despite an early chance for Lisa De Vanna, when the ball was cleared off her feet by the Victory goalkeeper Melissa Barbieri, Glory were unable to create chances. The Victory scored in the 34th and 71st minutes to secure a 2–0 win.

Playing against Newcastle Jets at Perth Oval on 10 October, Glory took the lead on 10 minutes when Collette McCallum sent a corner into the six yard box where it took a deflection off De Vanna into the goal. McCallum was credited with the goal. The Glory dominated the first half with De Vanna being influential in attack, setting up several chances to score. The momentum of the match changed in the second half with the Jets taking control of the match but were unable to score. The match ended 1–0 to Perth Glory.

After being substituted in the 31st minute of Perth's game against Adelaide United on 24 October at Hindmarsh Stadium, Lisa De Vanna abused members of the Glory coaching staff, the fourth official and members of the crowd. De Vanna received a two-match ban from Football Federation Australia (FFA), with one match suspended until the end of the season. De Vanna's replacement Sam Kerr almost scored three minutes later when a run led to her being one-on-one with the goalkeeper. A 47th minute goal for Alex Singer from a Kerr cross secured a 1–0 victory for the Glory.

Heading into the last match of the season at Inglewood Stadium on 5 December, Melbourne Victory needed a point to qualify for the final series while Perth Glory were not able to qualify. Deep in the second half, the match remained scoreless with the Victory having the majority of shots on goal. Assisted by Kate Gill, second half substitute De Vanna ran through the Victory defence and scored in the 81st minute. Gill put the match beyond doubt after 87 minutes with a 25-metre half-volley. The Glory finished the season in sixth, one point out of the finals positions.

Standings

Players
Confirmed signings as of 2/10/09.

Coach: John Gibson
Captain: Tanya Oxtoby

Transfers

In
 Emma Wirkus (Adelaide United)
 Elissia Canham
 Sadie Lawrence
 Ellis Glanfield
 Zoe Palandri
 Kate Gill
 Alex Singer

Out
 Kate Stewart
 Ciara Conway
 Katy Coghlan
 Elle Semmens
 Rachael Smith
 Shiya Lim
 Emily Dunn
 Maya Diederichsen
 Luisa Marzotto

Leading scorers

Squad statistics

Source: Soccerway

References

2009
Perth Glory